= State Advertising Agency (Azerbaijan) =

- Azərbaycan Respublikasının Dövlət Reklam Agentliyi

Agency overview
- Formed: June 20, 2017; 9 years ago
- Jurisdiction: Republic of Azerbaijan
- Headquarters: Khagani Rustamov street, 7C, Khatai, Baku, Azerbaijan
- Agency executive: Adigozalov Farhad Asgar oglu, Chairman of the Board
- Website: adra.gov.az/az/melumatlar/aciq-mekanda-reklama-ictimai-nezaret/

The State Advertising Agency of the Azerbaijan (SDA) (Azerbaijani: Azərbaycan Respublikasının Dövlət Reklam Agentliyi - ADRA) is an Azerbaijani government agency that controls the placement of advertisements in open spaces and production and distribution of advertising placed on advertising carriers in the Republic of Azerbaijan. The operations and organization of the agency is carried out in accordance with the decisions of the President of the Republic of Azerbaijan.

The agency's remit is to ensure that the advertising environment is maintained, improved, and the protection of legal and technical requirements for the content of the ads and advertising carriers.

== History ==
The State Advertising Agency of the Republic of Azerbaijan was established on June 20, 2017, according to decree that was signed on the basis of controlling and unifying regulations on production, and distribution of advertising for their placements in the open space within the borders of the Republic of Azerbaijan. According to the Decree, SDA as public legal agency has authority to fine those who violates the state regulations on advertisements.

== Structure ==
The agency is operating by a supervisory board and a director. The Board of the agency has overall control over it and consisted of 3 members including the head of the Board who are appointed and dismissed by the President of the Republic of Azerbaijan. The term of office for them is 5 years. The works of the Board and its activities are organized and directed by the head of the Board. He determines the agenda of the meetings and holds sessions and leads them.

The Director of Agency is responsible for performing the duties entrusted to the Agency by the President of the Republic of Azerbaijan.

== Agency powers ==
The agency has the following powers according to its statue;

- Preparing and submitting relevant drafts of legal acts on corresponding fields and also participating in their preparation of those drafts;
- Attracting experts in its activities in accordance with certain agreements;
- Cooperating with international organizations, relevant bodies (agencies) and distributors of advertising of foreign countries in order to explore possibilities of applying international experiences, and learn from their experiences;
- Questioning state entities, local self-government bodies, legal and natural persons about required information (documents) or directly acquiring those information from them;
- Preparing analytical materials on the relevant fields, conducting researches and making certain suggestions;
- Holding conferences, seminars and other events in accordance with its activities;
